H2k-Gaming was a professional esports organization based in London, United Kingdom. It was known for its  League of Legends team, which competed in Europe's top professional league, the EU LCS.

League of Legends 
Jungler Jean-Victor "loulex" Burgevin left the team in November 2015. They later signed former ROCCAT jungler Marcin "Jankos" Jankowski. They also signed Summer 2015 EU LCS MVP Konstantinos "FORG1VEN" Tzortziou.

Tournament results 
 3rd — 2016 League of Legends World Championship
 3rd – 2016 EU LCS Summer Split
 4th – 2016 EU LCS Spring Split

H2K finished with a league worst record of 2-16 during the 2018 EU LCS Summer Split. In the off season, the team decided not to apply for a spot as one of the franchised teams in the rebrand of EULCS to the LEC and subsequently disbanded, with the organization as a whole following shortly after.

Call of Duty 
In January 2016, H2K signed a Call of Duty team consisting of Damod "FEARS" Abney, Tyree "LegaL" Glove, Phillip "PHiZZURP" Klemenov, Andres "Lacefield" Lacefield. The team qualified for the Call of Duty World League. On 2 October 2016, Phillip "PHiZZURP" Klemenov died, following a car crash.

Hearthstone 
Simon "Sottle" Welch joined H2K on 22 May 2015. On 4 November 2015 he left to join complexity Gaming.

References

External links 
 

Esports teams based in England
Esports teams based in the United Kingdom
Former European League of Legends Championship Series teams
Call of Duty teams
Defunct and inactive Overwatch teams
Defunct and inactive Counter-Strike teams
Defunct and inactive Hearthstone teams
 
Esports teams established in 2003